Madonna is a name from the 16th century, originally used as a respectful form of address to an Italian woman. It comes from Old Italian phrase ma donna which means "my lady". It was later adopted as one of titles for Mary, mother of Jesus in Roman Catholic tradition in the 17th century.

According to various international observers, including linguists, the name has become prominently associated with American singer Madonna since the late twentieth century. She registered her name for trademark in the United States during the 1980s. Her trademark was also recognized internationally when she won a legal case in 2000 through the United Nations' arbitration at the World Intellectual Property Organization (WIPO).

Etymology and title for Mary, mother of Jesus

Madonna comes from Old Italian language words of ma ("my") and donna ("lady"). In modern Italian, "my lady" is translated as mia donna. The name is alternatively spelled as Madona and Madonnah. Its short-form nicknames include Maddy, Maddie, Madge, and Donna. Madonna was first attested in the 16th century as a respectful form of address to an Italian woman. It became a loanword to English language in 1584, defining as "an idealized virtuous and beautiful woman" (Oxford Dictionary of English, 1998). Madonna was also used to mean "prostitute" in early modern England. The derogatory sense of the term is clear in Thomas Dekker's Blurt, Master Constable (1602).

Although the Bible makes no mention of the word Madonna, it was adopted as one of titles for Mary, mother of Jesus, in the 17th century (circa the 1640s). The term has not been present in general Christianity, but is particular to Roman Catholic tradition. It was not used by Protestant denomination which dominated the American religious cultural landscape at the time, "making it a particular metaphor for a certain kind of grouping of characteristics". Agents such as Stephen Knapp have referred to the word as a "Catholic term", with an author from Foundations Bible College calling it a symbol of purity and virginity in Romanism.

With the definite article (the Madonna), the term appeared as a complimentary term noting a likeness to Mary. This designation to Mary as pointed out the International Marian Research Institute at University of Dayton, is translated into English as "Our Lady", and that term is also known in other languages of traditionally Catholic regions as Nuestra Señora (Spanish), Notre-Dame (French), Nossa Senhora (Portuguse) or Unsere liebe Frau (German).

Traditionally, the Madonna has been mostly used for "images of Mary holding the infant Jesus" although is also referred to depictions of Mary without Jesus, according to publications ranging from 19th to 21st century. In modern times, as reported Ginny Kubitz Moyer of Busted Halo, the term is very familiar to art historians thanks to Marian arts. Many have follow the distinction when it comes to Mary holding the infant or without him to apply the term. In a 1957 article from linguistic journal Transactions of the Philological Society, the word is defined as "essentially a term of art criticism and hardly belongs to the religious language of England". 

Mary's influence is also noted in terms such as the Madonna–whore complex, also known as "the Virgin/whore complex" in some cultures, and has been used as a Christian teaching about sexuality and the female body. In other cultures, like the modern Japan, historically the word Madonna has little to do with Mary according to the International Comparative Literature Association. The popularity of the word in that country was attributed to novelist Natsume Sōseki in the early-20th century, when he used it as a nickname for a character in one of his publications. Others have interpreted the term to mean "virgin" in the broadest sense (virginity) as an original Italian word, while more extensively, the word has been used for others as to mean all sorts of things about women.

Late 20th-century effects

19th-century writer Thomas Adolphus Trollope described the term "Madonna", as in extenso "appropriated exclusively to the Holy Virgin". The in extenso association to Mary was affected after the advent of Madonna (born Madonna Louise Ciccone, 1958), an American singer who's given name and middle name were taken from her mother, Madonna Louise. For example, the semiotician Victorino Zecchetto explained that in the Western system of meanings, "Madonna" evoked only the Virgin Mary, but after the appearance of the singer, the semantic field favored other interpretations. Author Michael Campbell similarly claimed that the term acquired a more contemporary image: "The pop star whose given name was enough to identify her to the world at large". She was also included in the definition of the word in print or online dictionaries like Collins English Dictionary, Oxford Dictionary of English (2010), and Online Etymology Dictionary, as well in reference works of general knowledge.

Criticisms from traditionalist, high culture and religious sectors
Madonna frequently played and explored various female roles such as the whore complex, and often employed religious imagery in provocative ways. In doing so, the singer received attacks from traditionalists, high culture authors and religious (especially Catholics); Maury Dean documented how the singer was noted for her morality and name coincidence. Finnish religious studies magazine Temenos, commented that "several Christian critics" insisted on calling her by her second name, as Madonna is "anything but Madonna-like". Some of these criticism ranged from claiming, "once it was a name spoken with reverence, but now people have a whole new attitude toward the name", to describe: "Madonna has appropriated the word and turned the intended insult to her advantage". Traditional Catholic activist, Plinio Corrêa de Oliveira used her name with "quotation marks".

In her 2015 book, The Authority of Women in the Catholic Church, Catholic theologian Monica Migliorino Miller of the Madonna University recognized the psyche associated to the singer, but lamented: "When the word Madonna is mentioned, it's not Mary who comes to mind but someone arguably her antithesis. [She] has managed to rise to the center of consciousness when the word is used in the public square. It's not Christ's mother who comes to mind but a crude and irreverent vocalist". In a 1991 article for Irish Catholic periodical The Furrow, catechist Stephanie Walsh explored about a generational gap in a fast-changing society.

Common association with American singer Madonna (b. 1958)

After the debut of singer Madonna in the late 20th century (1980s), the name and term has been heavily associated to her according to several authors and publications. According to the Rock and Roll Hall of Fame, "Madonna is one of the most recognizable names in the world – and not just the world of music."

Explanations vary. For example, anthologist Bruce Lansky, as reported in The Canberra Times, found that although Bible has some influence for perceptions of people's names, pop culture has a greater sway for it. He said: "Madonna Ciccone already has out stripped the Virgin Mother as the archetype for her name." Lansky noted Madonna as a perfect example of someone shaped by her name or, in her case, the rejection of it. In a 1996 article for academic journal New Theatre Quarterly, Mark Watts wrote that "the persona (Ciccone) can be said to be signified of the word 'Madonna'. It embodies the indescribable combination of ideas that enters our mind when we think 'Madonna' —singer, star, exhibitionist, whataever". 

Singer's influence is also noted on the Internet Age landscape, mainly in simplified results on websites and search engines of general use. For example, art museum Castagnino+macro concurred that the viewpoint of the word "Madonna" has been changing, and Google results, for example, are virtually limited to Madonna Louise Veronica Ciccone, id est, Madonna. On the same plain, a contributor from art institution MoMA PS1 said that "Madonna as Mary doesn't even show up on the first five pages of a simple Google search". Musician turned-writer Alina Simone also noted singer's influence, by saying in Madonnaland (2016) "Google Madonna's name and the mother of Jesus is nowhere in sight". In her investigation, she described as "crushing" the flood of the information on the singer that are in constantly "growing".

Popularity

Various international observers agreed that Madonna is a rare name for babies, even among Catholic population. It was not used as a given name in Italy and was first used as a name by Italian Americans. The oldest Madonna in the United States census is Madonna Klotz (born 1843), daughter of John and Julianna in Philadelphia. The US Social Security's yearly baby name lists started in 1880, but Madonna only began entering the top-1,000 position in 1909. The name reached an all-time peak at 536th in 1933 and made its last appearance within the top 1,000 in 1968. The American singer's early popularity helped give a slight increase in the 1980s, but it did not last long. Since 1992 fewer than 20 newly-born babies named Madonna in the United States every year.

The singer herself claimed to have never met anyone else with the name other than her mother while growing up. Janaya Wecker from Men's Health wrote "Not many new parents have dared to name their kid after the Queen of Pop..." Writing for Omaha World-Herald in 2016, Cleveland Evans, a Bellevue University psychology professor said that Madonna still so rare as a name because "it's the premier example of a rare name so identified with one super-celebrity", further adding that "Madonna won't have many namesakes until parents of newborns no longer think only of the 'high priestess of pop' when they hear or see 'Madonna'".

Beyond its usage, lexicographers such as Iseabail Macleod agree that the name was "made famous" by the singer. As documents British linguist, David Crystal, she is a well-known example of a single-name.

Trademark
The American singer became one of the earliest celebrities to register her name for trademark in the United States in the 1980s. Her trademark for the name Madonna was also recognized internationally when she won a legal case in 2000 through the United Nations' arbitration at the World Intellectual Property Organization (WIPO). In comparison, her fellow British singer Sting's case was denied by WIPO in the same year, because sting was considered "a common English word".

JD Supra Business Advisor, explored a "scandalous" case in the 1930s after an intent to register the "Madonna Wine", with complainers arguing the word has been popular in several English-speaking countries due to association with Mary; in contrast, website further adds that in the post 1979-years, the "singer altered and distracted from the previous and exclusive reference to the Virgin Mary". In 1993, The Trademark Reporter mentioned another case by saying "apparently, the term 'Madonna' was still believed to be generally understood as referring to the Virgin Mary in 1959. Whether that might be found true in 1993 is another question".

List of people

Given name
 Madonna (born Madonna Louise Ciccone, 1958), American singer, songwriter, actress
 Madonna Blyth (born 1985), Australian field hockey player
 Madonna Buder (born 1930), Roman Catholic religious sister and Senior Olympian triathlete
 Madonna Constantine, American psychology and education professor
 Madonna Gimotea (born 1974), retired gymnast from Canada
 Madonna Harris (born 1956), New Zealand multi-sportswoman
 Madonna King, Australian journalist, author, and media commentator
 Madonna Oriente (died 1390), alleged religious figure
 Madonna Sebastian (born 1992), Indian actress and singer
 Madonna Soctomah, Passamaquoddy politician from Maine
 Madonna Staunton (1938–2019) Australian artist and poet
 Madonna Swan (1928–1993), American Indian writer
 Madonna Tassi, Canadian vocalist
 Madonna Thunder Hawk (born 1940), Native American civil rights activist
 Madonna Marie Hines, the birth name of American singer Marie Hines

Surname
 Armando Madonna (born 1963), Italian football manager and former player
 Jon C. Madonna, retired, business executive
 G. Terry Madonna, professor
 Matthew Madonna (1935–2020), street boss of the Lucchese crime family
 Paul Madonna (born 1972), American artist
 Nicola Madonna (born 1986), Italian footballer

Alias and stage name
 Madonna, a nickname of Joan Baez
 Madonna (nickname), a moniker of several individuals after the American singer
 Madonna Wayne Gacy, from the band Marilyn Manson
 Madonna, leader of 1990s gang 5T
 The Blessed Madonna (born Marea Stamper, 1977), American DJ

Notes

References

English feminine given names
Madonna